The Picnkeyville/Du Quoin Airport is a civil, public use airport located 6 miles southeast of Pinckneyville and about 9 miles west of Du Quoin, Illinois, United States. The airport is publicly owned by the two cities.

The airport has one runway: runway 18/36 is 3999 x 60 ft (1219 x 18 m) and made of asphalt.

The airport is served by an FBO called Sparta Aero Services. It offers fuel, aircraft hangars and parking, a conference room, and pilot lounges.

For the 12-month period ending April 30, 2021, the airport averaged 22 aircraft operations per day, or about 8,000 per year, consisting entirely of general aviation operations. For the same time period, there were 17 aircraft on the field, all single engine.

The airport received $100,000 from the State of Illinois as part of the Rebuild Illinois program during the COVID-19 pandemic. The money went toward buying snow removal equipment.

References 

Airports in Illinois